Gabriela Santis (born 4 November 1996) is a Guatemalan swimmer. She competed in the women's 200 metre freestyle event at the 2017 World Aquatics Championships.

In 2019, she represented Guatemala at the 2019 World Aquatics Championships held in Gwangju, South Korea. She competed in the women's 100 metre freestyle and women's 200 metre freestyle events. In both events she did not advance to compete in the semi-finals.

References

External links
 
 Delta State Lady Statesmen bio

1996 births
Living people
Guatemalan female swimmers
Place of birth missing (living people)
Guatemalan female freestyle swimmers
Swimmers at the 2020 Summer Olympics
Olympic swimmers of Guatemala
Pan American Games competitors for Guatemala
Swimmers at the 2019 Pan American Games
Delta State Statesmen and Lady Statesmen
College women's swimmers in the United States